Escadrille Spa.152 (originally Escadrille N.152) was a French fighter squadron active 1917 through 1918 during World War I. It was credited with destruction of 15 German airplanes, 27 observation balloons, and a Zeppelin.

History

Escadrille Spa.152 was formed under VII Armee auspices at Lyon-Bron, France on 9 July 1917. As a Nieuport fighter squadron, it was designated Escadrille N.152. In May 1918, the squadron refitted with SPAD fighters, and was renamed Escadrille Spa.152. On 4 June 1918, it was incorporated into a makeshift unit that became Groupe de Combat 22 on 1 July 1918. The Groupe was shifted about in its combat operations between three French field armies as the war ground down to its 11 November 1918 ceasefire. Final aerial victory credits for the squadron came to destruction of 15 enemy airplanes, 27 observation balloons, and a Zeppelin.

Commanding officers
 Lieutenant Charles Lefevre: 9 July 1917 - 20 November 1917
 Lieutenant Louis Delrieu: 20 November 1917 - 19 August 1918
 Capitaine L. Bonne: 19 August 1918 - Armistice

Notable members
 Lieutenant Léon Bourjade
 Sous lieutenant Ernest Maunoury

Aircraft
 Nieuport fighters: 9 July 1917 - May 1918
 SPAD fighters: May 1918 onwards

End notes

Reference
 Franks, Norman; Bailey, Frank (1993). Over the Front: The Complete Record of the Fighter Aces and Units of the United States and French Air Services, 1914–1918 London, UK: Grub Street Publishing. .

Fighter squadrons of the French Air and Space Force
Military units and formations established in 1917
Military units and formations disestablished in 1918
Military units and formations of France in World War I
Military aviation units and formations in World War I